The Fox is a pub at 39 Church Street, Twickenham, London TW1.

It is a Grade II listed building, dating back to the 18th century.

References

External links
 
 

Grade II listed pubs in London
Pubs in the London Borough of Richmond upon Thames
Grade II listed buildings in the London Borough of Richmond upon Thames